Tillis is a surname. Notable people with the surname include: 

Antonio D. Tillis, American academic administrator
Darren Tillis (born 1960), American basketball player
Frederick C. Tillis (1930–2020), American composer
Iciss Tillis (born 1981), American basketball player
James Tillis (born 1957), American boxer and actor
Mel Tillis (1932–2017), American country music singer and songwriter
Pam Tillis (born 1957), American country music singer and actress, daughter of Mel
Rick Tillis (born 1963), American politician
Thom Tillis (born 1960), American politician